Breaking Free is a 2015 film directed by Sridhar Rangayan and produced by Solaris Pictures. In this documentary, filmmaker and gay activist Sridhar Rangayan embarks on a personal journey to expose the human rights violations faced by the LGBTQ community in India due to a draconian law Section 377 and homophobic social mores of a patriarchal society.
The film was selected to be part of the Indian Panorama (non-Fiction) and screened at International Film Festival of India in 2015.

It won the Rajat Kamal National Award for Best Editing (Non-Fiction) in 2016 for its editors Pravin Angre and Sridhar Rangayan. It also won the Barbara Gittings Human Rights Award at qFLIX Philadelphia in 2016. 
It is currently streaming on Netflix.

Cast 
Anand Grover
Arvind Narrain
Ashok Row Kavi
Jaya Sharma
Manohar Elavarthi
Maya Sharma
Pallav Patankar
Shobhna Kumar
Sridhar Rangayan
Vivek Anand

References

External links 
 
 Solaris Pictures 
 

2015 films
Indian LGBT-related films
LGBT-related films based on actual events
2015 LGBT-related films
Documentary films about LGBT topics